The 2012–13 BBL season was the 26th campaign of the British Basketball League since the league's establishment in 1987. The season featured 12 teams from across England and Scotland including a new entrant, the reformed Manchester Giants, who were based on the original franchise of the same name that folded in 2001. East London Royals were due to become the 13th member of the League, but after their financial backing fell through weeks before the start of the season, the League deferred their entry until the 2013–14 season. The pre-season also saw long-time member franchise Milton Keynes Lions relocate to London and rebrand itself as the London Lions, whilst Cheshire Jets – encountering severe financial difficulties and threatened with the franchise being dissolved – were saved by campaigning local fans and businessmen and renamed as Cheshire Phoenix midway through the season.

The Championship regular season commenced on 21 September 2012 with reigning Champions Newcastle Eagles beginning the defence of their title with a 72–65 victory over Glasgow Rocks. The regular season saw all teams face each other three times during the campaign, playing either two games at home and once on the road or vice versa, with the top-eight placed teams advancing to the play-offs, which took place in April 2013. The season climaxed on 28 April with the showpiece Play-off Final, which returned to its former home at Wembley Arena, for the first time since 2002. Leicester Riders dominated the campaign, and were successful in three of the BBL's four annual competition's, claiming the League title, BBL Cup and Play-off title. Sheffield Sharks thwarted the possibility of a "clean sweep" with a victory against the odds over the Riders in the BBL Trophy Final.

Teams

Notable occurrences
New entrant Manchester Giants joined as the League's 12th franchise whilst East London Royals, who were due to become the 13th member, deferred entry to the 2013–14 season after their financial backing fell through prior to the start of the season. Reading Rockets also had a bid to join the league rejected earlier in the year.
Although initially planning to enter as new franchises for the 2012–13 season, both BBL Birmingham and Essex Leopards postponed their entry until the 2013–14 season.
Long-time member franchise Milton Keynes Lions relocated to London after their previous home venue was sold off by its owners, and rebranded itself as the London Lions. Initially they will use the Crystal Palace National Sports Centre for home games but will eventually move to the Copper Box – built for the 2012 Summer Olympics – from 2013.
Guildford Heat rebranded its franchise as the Surrey Heat to reflect its geographical reach in terms of fan base and community programmes.
New rules introduced prior to the start of the season now allows team's to field only a maximum of five non-British players per game (including up to three work permitted players), demonstrating the League's commitment towards developing British players.
On 10 August, Cheshire Jets owner Pete Hawkins announced that the franchise was up for sale after negotiations with a proposed new owner collapsed. With the help of a "Save the Jets" campaign ran by local newspaper the Chester Chronicle, local businessman Haydn Cook stepped-in as the new owner of the franchise just weeks before the start of the new season, ensuring the immediate future of the franchise.
More than 5,000 fans attended Glasgow Rocks' inaugural game at their new Emirates Arena home on 7 October. Glasgow were defeated 84–106 by arch-rivals Newcastle Eagles.
After less than a month in the role, Cheshire's James Hamilton resigned as the team's player-coach on 15 October, due to his suspension following an altercation at a junior game.
On 30 October it was announced that the Cheshire Jets franchise had been withdrawn by the League after new-owner Haydn Cook reported severe financial difficulties and requested to postpone upcoming fixtures and make all staff and players redundant with immediate effect. The following day it was revealed that the League had reinstated the franchise and would manage its operation centrally whilst trying to find a new owner. The club was temporarily renamed Cheshire Basketball Club as previous owner Cook retained the Jets name, logo, kits and branding. A "Save the Jets" campaign led by local fans and businessmen secured the required £50,000 needed to take over the franchise within the League's deadline of 30 November, and guaranteed the immediate future of the club. Renamed as Cheshire Phoenix, the franchise will operate as a not-for-profit Community Interest Club, whilst linking up with Chester (who faced a similar situation two years earlier) in a supporting partnership."
Worthing Thunder – of the English Basketball League – became the first ever non-BBL team to progress past the 1st Round of the BBL Trophy after an 84–64 win at home to Mersey Tigers on 6 January 2013.
Leicester Riders won their first silverware in 12 years on 13 January, with an 85–80 victory over Newcastle Eagles in the BBL Cup Final. Jay Cousinard, who scored 17 points, was named as the game's MVP.
Leicester's 84–59 regular season victory over Manchester Giants on 19 February made the Riders only the fifth team in League history to go unbeaten for a whole year, having last been defeated on 25 February 2012 (Their upcoming schedule mean that the landmark date would pass before their next game).
Sheffield Sharks claimed the BBL Trophy after a narrow two-point win over Leicester in front of over 5,000 fans at Glasgow's Emirates Arena, on 9 March. Sheffield's 71–69 victory prevented Leicester from winning a Cup-Trophy double, whilst it was Sharks' first Trophy final win for 15 years.
Mersey Tigers secured the record for the longest losing-sreak in League history on 22 March. Their 92–79 defeat to Plymouth Raiders was their 31st consecutive loss, having last won a game against Milton Keynes on 15 April 2012.
Leicester Riders were crowned League Champions for the first time in their history following their 93–70 home victory over Durham Wildcats on 31 March.
Riders finished the campaign with a historic 65-57 win over Newcastle in the Play-off Final at a packed-out Wembley Arena on 28 April.

BBL Championship (Tier 1)

Final standings

The play-offs

Quarter-finals
(1) Leicester Riders vs. (8) London Lions

(2) Newcastle Eagles vs. (7) Sheffield Sharks

(3) Glasgow Rocks vs. (6) Plymouth Raiders

(4) Surrey Heat vs. (5) Worcester Wolves

Semi-finals
(1) Leicester Riders vs. (6) Plymouth Raiders

(2) Newcastle Eagles vs. (4) Surrey Heat

Final

EBL National League Division 1 (Tier 2)

Final standings

EBL National League Division 2 (Tier 3)

Final standings

+ PAWS London Capital deducted twelve points for fielding an ineligible player during the 2011–12 season.

BBL Cup
The winners of the four 1st Round matches were joined by Newcastle Eagles, Leicester Riders, Plymouth Raiders and Worcester Wolves in the Quarter-finals, who received byes for finishing in the top four BBL Championship positions last season. The Final was played on 13 January 2013 at the National Indoor Arena in Birmingham.

1st round

Quarter-finals

Semi-finals
Plymouth Raiders vs. Newcastle Eagles

Sheffield Sharks vs. Leicester Riders

Final

BBL Trophy
The 12 BBL clubs were joined by Essex Leopards and Reading Rockets of the English Basketball League and Edinburgh Kings of the Scottish Basketball League to form a straight knock-out competition. Following the withdrawal of East London Royals prior to the start of the competition, Worthing Thunder from the English Basketball League were invited to take their place and play Mersey Tigers in the 1st Round. The first two rounds featured one-off games whilst the Semi-finals took place over two legs. The Final was held at the Emirates Arena in Glasgow and saw Sheffield Sharks claim their first Trophy in 15 years, after 71–69 victory over Leicester Riders.

1st round

Quarter-finals

Semi-finals
Cheshire Phoenix vs. Sheffield Sharks

Leicester Riders vs. Worcester Wolves

Final

Statistics leaders

Monthly awards

Seasonal awards

Molten Most Valuable Player: Andrew Sullivan (Leicester Riders)
Molten Coach of the Year: Rob Paternostro (Leicester Riders)
Molten Team of the Year:
Travis Holmes (Surrey Heat)
Andrew Sullivan (Leicester Riders)
Jay Cousinard (Leicester Riders)
Matt Schneck (Plymouth Raiders)
Kareem Maddox (Newcastle Eagles)
Molten Defensive Team of the Year:
Andrew Sullivan (Leicester Riders)
Kareem Maddox (Newcastle Eagles)
Chavis Holmes (Surrey Heat)
Jay Cousinard (Leicester Riders)
Zaire Taylor (Leicester Riders)
Molten British Team of the Year:
Andrew Sullivan (Leicester Riders)
Mike Tuck (Sheffield Sharks)
Sam Cricelli (Surrey Heat)
Orlan Jackman (London Lions)
Anthony Rowe (Leicester Riders)

References

British Basketball League seasons
1
British